Nikolay Vladimirovich Kuznetsov (born 13 May 1979 in Leningrad, USSR) is a specialist in nonlinear dynamics and control theory.

Academic career
He graduated from the St. Petersburg University, Department of Theoretical Cybernetics chaired by V.A. Yakubovich, in 2001. In 2004 he received Candidate of Science degree (supervisor G.A. Leonov) and in 2016 Doctor of Science degree (Habilitation) from St. Petersburg University. From 2003 Nikolay Kuznetsov has been working in St. Petersburg University and now he is Full professor (tenured) and Head of the Department of Applied Cybernetics there. Since 2018 the research group chaired by Kuznetsov has been awarded the status of the Leading Scientific School (Center of Excellence) of Russia in the field of mathematics and mechanics. In 2020 he was named Professor of the Year in the field of mathematics and physics in Russia.

Since 2018, Kuznetsov is Head of the Laboratory of information and control systems at the Institute for Problems in Mechanical Engineering of the Russian Academy of Science. In 2022, Nikolay Kuznetsov was elected a member of the Russian Academy of Science.

In 2008, Kuznetsov defended his Ph.D. degree at the University of Jyväskylä, Finland (supervisors P. Neittaanmäki, G.A. Leonov).
After the defense, he has been working at the University of Jyväskylä as the Academy of Finland postdoc,
then as a part-time professor at the IT Faculty: from 2014 he is Adjunct Docent and from 2017 – Visiting Professor.
He is co-chair of the Finnish-Russian educational & research program organized in 2007
by the University of Jyväskylä  and St. Petersburg University. As a recognition, University of Jyväskylä awarded him a medal for his distinguished merits in the field of applied mathematics and training doctoral students, in 2020 he got the Finnish Information Processing Association (TIVIA) award and was elected a foreign member of the Finnish Academy of Science and Letters (becoming its youngest foreign member at the time of election). In 2021, the joint educational & research program was expanded to include the Lappeenranta-Lahti University of Technology, where Kuznetsov was offered the position of Visiting Professor.

The experience of the program he used in 2013 when organizing the first
defenses to the Ph.D. degree granted by St. Petersburg University,
instead of the Candidate of Sciences degrees awarded by the State Supreme Certification Commission.

Scientific work

Kuznetsov’s research interests are in dynamical systems and applied mathematics. In his works, a combination of rigorous analytical and reliable numerical methods allowed for both the advancement in solving previously known fundamental unsolved problems as well as the development of modern engineering technologies. Among his main results are the development of the theory of hidden oscillations and the concept of self-excited and hidden attractors, the discovery of a hidden Chua attractor in Chua circuits, revealing of coexisting hidden attractors in electomechanical models with Sommerfeld effect, solutions to the Egan problem on the pull-in range and to the Gardner problem on the lock-in range for phase-locked loops, nonlinear analysis of the  CP-PLL and validation of the Gardner conjecture, counterexamples with self-excited and hidden attractors to  the classical describing function method,
developed effective analytical-numerical methods for the construction of counterexamples to
the Kalman conjecture on the absolute stability of control systems,
provided justification of time-varying linearization and analysis of
Perron effects of the Lyapunov exponent sign reversal, effective analytical-numerical method for
the finite-time and exact Lyapunov dimension computation, and proof of the Eden conjecture for a number of dynamical systems.

The Web of Science Group proclaimed Kuznetsov a Highly Cited Researcher in Russia twice over two consecutive years (2016-2017) and included him in the worldwide list of Highly Cited Researchers in 2019
(where he was among 3 scientists from St. Petersburg University and the only one from the University of Jyväskylä), 2020, and 2021.
He was awarded the St. Petersburg University Prize in 2020 and the Afraimovich Award in 2021
for The theory of hidden oscillations and stability of dynamical systems.

Additional information
 N.V. Kuznetsov at Google scholar
 N.V. Kuznetsov at Scopus
 N.V. Kuznetsov at Web of Science
 N.V. Kuznetsov at Mathematics Genealogy Project
 World Top Mathematics Scientists
 Mathematician Nikolay Kuznetsov at St. Petersburg University. St. Petersburg University News. 10 Jan 2022
 Abramovich S., Kuznetsov N., Razov A., G.A. Leonov: eminent scholar, admired teacher and unconventional administrator, Journal of Physics: Conference Series, Vol. 1864, 2021, art. num. 012066.
 S. Abramovich, N. Kuznetsov, G. Leonov. V. A. Yakubovich — mathematician, “father of the field”, and herald of intellectual democracy in science and society, IFAC-PapersOnLine, 48(11), 2015, 1–3 (video)

Selected lectures
 N.Kuznetsov, Keynote lecture Hidden attractors in science and technologies, General meeting of the Finnish Academy of Science and Letters, Finland, 2021
 N.Kuznetsov, Invited lecture The theory of hidden oscillations and stability of dynamical systems, Int. Workshop on Applied Mathematics, Czech Republic, 2021
 N. Kuznetsov, Afraimovich award plenary lecture The theory of hidden oscillations and stability of dynamical systems, Int. Conference on Nonlinear Dynamics and Complexity, USA, 2021

Selected publications: books and surveys

References

1979 births
Living people
Saint Petersburg State University alumni
University of Jyväskylä alumni
Chaos theorists
Hidden oscillation
Members of the Finnish Academy of Science and Letters